Anastasia Pavlyuchenkova was the defending champion, but withdrew before the event started.

Carla Suárez Navarro won the title, defeating Svetlana Kuznetsova in the final, 6–4, 3–6, 6–4.

Seeds

 Carla Suárez Navarro (champion)
 Eugenie Bouchard (quarterfinals)
 Samantha Stosur (first round)
 Roberta Vinci (quarterfinals)

 Kaia Kanepi (second round)
 Lucie Šafářová (second round)
 Svetlana Kuznetsova (final)
 Elena Vesnina (semifinals)

Draw

Finals

Top half

Bottom half

Qualifying

Seeds

  Dinah Pfizenmaier (second round)
  Mona Barthel (second round)
  Kristina Mladenovic (qualified)
  Sharon Fichman (first round)
  Olga Govortsova (first round)
  Silvia Soler Espinosa (qualifying competition)
  Estrella Cabeza Candela (second round)
  Irina-Camelia Begu (qualified)

Qualifiers

  Alla Kudryavtseva 
  Irina-Camelia Begu
  Kristina Mladenovic 
  Timea Bacsinszky

Draw

First qualifier

Second qualifier

Third qualifier

Fourth qualifier

References
 Main Draw
 Qualifying Draw

Women's Singles
Portugal Open - Women's Singles